Ylenja Lucaselli (born 22 April 1976) is an Italian politician and lawyer. She was elected to be a deputy to the Parliament of Italy in the 2018 Italian general election for the Legislature XVIII of Italy.

Career
She attended the University of Modena and Reggio Emilia.

She was elected to the Italian Parliament in the 2018 Italian general election, to represent the district of Emilia-Romagna for the Brothers of Italy.

References

Living people
Brothers of Italy politicians
1976 births
Deputies of Legislature XVIII of Italy
People from Taranto
21st-century Italian women politicians
Women members of the Chamber of Deputies (Italy)